MacKenzie "Mack" Todd Miller   (October 16, 1921 – December 10, 2010) was an American Thoroughbred racehorse trainer and owner/breeder. During his forty-six-year career, he conditioned seventy-two stakes winners, including four Eclipse Award champions.

Education and military service
Mack Miller grew up near the Keeneland Race Course, and attended its first race in 1936. He studied at the Bolles School in Jacksonville, Florida then at the University of Kentucky but interrupted his education to serve with the United States Army Air Forces during World War II. After the war's end, in 1947 he went to work as a stable hand for Calumet Farm. He became involved with conditioning horses, and took out his training license in 1949.

Hall of Fame training career
Miller trained 1974 Epsom Derby winner Snow Knight who had been purchased by E. P. Taylor; Snow Knight was selected 1975's American Champion Male Turf Horse. Miller also trained for Charles W. Engelhard, Jr. He was then was hired by Paul Mellon for his Rokeby Stables. He and Mellon had their first Kentucky Derby win in 1993 with Sea Hero. Among their other successes, Winter's Tale won the 1980 Brooklyn Handicap, the Suburban Handicap, and the Marlboro Cup Invitational Handicap. In 1984, Fit to Fight won the New York Handicap Triple, a feat accomplished just three times in the near one hundred years that the three races existed simultaneously. No horse has won the Handicap Triple since.

Miller was inducted in the National Museum of Racing and Hall of Fame in 1987. There is a  Mack Miller Exhibit at the Aiken Thoroughbred Racing Hall of Fame and Museum, where he operated a winter training facility for many years before selling to Janice and Robert McNair, the then owners of Stonerside Stable. Other honors he has received include the 1993 Honor Guest at the Thoroughbred Club of America's Testimonial Dinner from the National Turf Writers Association. Following his retirement, he was elected to The Jockey Club in 1997. He was the co-breeder of De La Rose, the 1981 American Champion Female Turf Horse, and Chilukki, the 1999 American Champion Two-Year-Old Filly.

Miller died at the University of Kentucky Hospital.  He had been hospitalized on December 5 following a stroke.

Champions trained by Mack Miller
 Leallah – American Champion Two-Year-Old Filly (1956)
 Assagai – American Champion Male Turf Horse (1966)
 Hawaii – American Champion Male Turf Horse (1969)
 Snow Knight – American Champion Male Turf Horse (1975)

References

Further reading
 Fisher, Jonelle. MacKenzie Miller: The Gentleman from Morgan Street (2006)  St. Crispian Press ASIN B000OBE14G

External links
 Mr. and Mrs. MacKenzie (Mack) Miller at the NTRA
 The MacKenzie Miller Exhibition at the Aiken Thoroughbred Racing Hall of Fame and Museum
 Hall of Fame trainer Mack Miller dies at age 89

1921 births
2010 deaths
United States Army Air Forces personnel of World War II
American horse trainers
United States Thoroughbred Racing Hall of Fame inductees
People from Versailles, Kentucky
Bolles School alumni